Amer Husni Lutfi (1956 – March 2018) was head of the State Planning Commission of Syria. He served as the minister of economy and trade between 2004 and 2010. Lutfi holds a PhD in economic analysis, which he received from Université Libre de Bruxelles, Belgium.

References

1956 births
Living people
Syrian ministers of economy
People from Homs
Arab Socialist Ba'ath Party – Syria Region politicians